The 1987–88 National Hurling League (known as the Royal Liver National Hurling League for sponsorship reasons) was the 57th edition of the National Hurling League.

Division 1

Galway came into the season as defending champions of the 1985-86 season. Westmeath and Wexford entered Division 1 as the promoted teams.

On 24 April 1988, Tipperary won the title following a 3-15 to 2-9 win over Offaly in the final. It was their first league title since 1978-79 and their 14th National League title overall.

Clare and Cork were relegated from Division 1.

Tipperary's Pat Fox was the Division 1 top scorer with 6-40.

Table

Group stage

Play-off

Knock-out stage

Quarter-finals

Semi-finals

Final

Scoring statistics

Top scorers overall

Top scorers in a single game

Division 2

Down, Offaly, Roscommon and Westmeath entered Division 2 as the promoted and relegated teams from the previous season.

On 6 March 1988, Offaly secured the title following a 1-13 to 3-4 win over Down in the final round of the group stage. Antrim secured promotion to Division 1 as the second-placed team.

Down and Roscommon were relegated from Division 2.

Table

Division 3

Mayo, Meath and Tyrone entered Division 3 as the promoted and relegated teams from the previous season.

Meath secured the title following a 5-7 to 2-5 win over Kildare in the final round of the group stage. Derry secured promotion to Division 2 as the second-placed team.

Tyrone were relegated from Division 3.

Table

Division 4

Monaghan entered Division 4 as the relegated team from the previous season.

On 29 July 1988, Longford secured the title following a 2-9 to 2-7 win over Monaghan in a replay of the league final.

Knock-out stage

Semi-final

Finals

External links
 1987-88 National Hurling League results

References

National Hurling League seasons
League
League